The Nagas are various ethnic groups native to northeastern India and northwestern Myanmar. The groups have similar cultures and traditions, and form the majority of population in the Indian states of Nagaland and Manipur and Naga Self-Administered Zone of Myanmar; with significant populations in Arunachal Pradesh and Assam in India; Sagaing Region and Kachin State in Myanmar (Burma).

The Nagas are divided into various Naga ethnic groups whose numbers and population are unclear. They each speak distinct Naga languages often unintelligible to the others, but all are loosely connected to each other.

Etymology 
The present day Naga people have historically been referred to by many names, like 'Noga' by Assamese, 'Hao' by Manipuri and 'Chin' by Burmese.  However, over time 'Naga' became the commonly accepted nomenclature, and was also used by the British. According to the Burma Gazetteer, the term 'Naga' is of doubtful origin and is used to describe hill tribes that occupy the country between the Chins  in the south and Kachins (Singphos) in the Northeast.

History

Culture

Art 
The Naga people love colour as is evident in the shawls designed and woven by women, and in the headgear that both sexes design. Clothing patterns are traditional to each group, and the cloths are woven by the women. They use beads in variety, profusion and complexity in their jewelry, along with a wide range of materials including glass, shell, stone, teeth or tusk, claws, horns, metal, bone, wood, seeds, hair, and fibre.

According to Dr. Verrier Elwin, these groups made all the goods they used, as was once common in many traditional societies: "they have made their own cloth, their own hats and rain-coats; they have prepared their own medicines, their own cooking-vessels, their own substitutes for crockery.". Craftwork includes the making of baskets, weaving of cloth, wood carving, pottery, metalwork, jewellery-making and bead-work.

Weaving of colorful woolen and cotton shawls is a central activity for women of all Nagas. One of the common features of Naga shawls is that three pieces are woven separately and stitched together. Weaving is an intricate and time consuming work and each shawl takes at least a few days to complete. Designs for shawls and wraparound garments (commonly called mekhala) are different for men and women.  Among many groups the design of the shawl denotes the social status of the wearer. Some of the more known shawls include Tsüngkotepsü and Rongsü of the Aos; Sütam, Ethasü, Longpensü of the Lothas; Süpong of the Sangtams, Rongkhim and Tsüngrem Khim of the Yimkhiungs; and the Angami Lohe shawls with thick embroidered animal motifs.

Naga jewelry is an equally important part of identity, with the entire community wearing similar bead jewelry, specifically the necklace.

The Indian Chamber of Commerce has filed an application seeking registration of traditional Naga shawls made in Nagaland with the Geographical Registry of India for Geographical Indication.

Cuisine 

Naga cuisine is characterized by smoked and fermented foods.

Folk song and dance 
Folk songs and dances are essential ingredients of the traditional Naga culture. The oral tradition is kept alive through the media of folk tales and songs. Naga folk songs are both romantic and historical, with songs narrating entire stories of famous ancestors and incidents. Seasonal songs describe activities done in a particular agricultural cycle. The early Western missionaries opposed the use of folk songs by Naga Christians as they were perceived to be associated with spirit worship, war, and immorality. As a result, translated versions of Western hymns were introduced, leading to the slow disappearance of indigenous music from the Naga hills.

Folk dances of the Nagas are mostly performed in groups in synchronized fashion, by both men and women, depending on the type of dance. Dances are usually performed at festivals and religious occasions. War dances are performed mostly by men and are athletic and martial in style. All dances are accompanied by songs and war cries by the dancers. Indigenous musical instruments made and used by the people are tati, bamboo mouth organs, bamboo flutes, trumpets, drums made of cattle skin and log drums.

Festivals 

The various Naga groups have their own distinct festivals. To promote inter-group interaction, the Government of Nagaland has organized the annual Hornbill Festival since 2000. Another inter-ethnic festival is Lui Ngai Ni. The group-specific festivals include:

Ethnic groups 

The word Naga originated as an exonym. Today, it covers a number of ethnic groups that reside in Nagaland, Manipur, Assam and Arunachal Pradesh states of India, and also in Myanmar.

Before the arrival of the British, the term "Naga" was used by Assamese to refer to certain isolated ethnic groups. The British adopted this term for a number of ethnic groups in the surrounding area, based on loose linguistic and cultural associations. The number of groups classified as "Naga" grew significantly in the 20th century: as of December 2015, 89 groups are classified as Naga by the various sources. This expansion in the "Naga" identity has been due to a number of factors including the quest for upward mobility in the society of Nagaland, and the desire to establish a common purpose of resistance against dominance by other groups.  In this way, the "Naga" identity has not always been fixed.

Nagas in India 
Nagas are present in all Northeast Indian States except Tripura and are listed as scheduled tribes in other 6 Northeastern States: Arunachal Pradesh, Assam, Manipur, Meghalaya, Mizoram and Nagaland

Nagas in Myanmar 
Nagas in Myanmar are mostly found in Sagaing Division and Kachin state. The Naga territory in Myanmar is marked by Kabaw valley in the south bordering to the Chin state, the Kachin on the north and the Burmese on the east.

The Major Naga ethnic groups in Myanmar are:

   Konyak (Chen)
   Lainong (Htangan)
   Makury
   Nokko (Khiamniungan) 
   Para
   Somra Tangkhul
   Tangshang

Some other minor Naga groups are Anāl, Lamkang, Moyon, Koka (sometimes spelt as Goga or Koki), Longphuri, Paung Nyuan (Makhyam), etc

The townships which are inhabited by the Nagas are:
 Homalin
 Lahe with Tanbakwe sub-township
 Layshi with Mowailut sub-township and Somra sub-township
 Hkamti
 Nanyun with Pangsau and Dunghi sub-township
 Tamu of Sagaing Division and
 Tanai of Kachin state

Anāl and Moyon are mainly found in Tamu township on the south and a few Somra Nagas are also found in and around Tamu bordering to Layshi jurisdiction. Makury, Para and Somra tribes are mainly found in Layshi township. Makury Nagas and a few Somra Nagas are also found in Homalin township. Lahe is highly populated by Konyak, Nokko, Lainong and Makury tribes. Nanyun on the north is the home of Tangshang tribe which comprises more than 54 sub-dialect groups. Homlin township is highly populated by the considered lost tribes (Red Shans). But Kukis, Burmese, Chinese and Indians are also found there. Hkamti township is populated altogether by all the Naga tribes majority and with a number of Burmese, Shans, Chinese and Indians. Tanai in Kachin state of Myanmar is inhabited by the Tangshang Nagas among the Kachin people.

Languages 

The Naga languages are either classified under the Chin-Naga languages or the Sal languages.

Nagas have more language diversity than any other ethnic group or states in India. Naga people speak over 89 different languages and dialects, mostly unintelligible with each other. However, there are many similarities in between different languages spoken by them. The diversity of languages and traditions of the Nagas results most likely from the multiple cultural absorptions that occurred during their successive migrations. According to legend, before settling in the region, these groups moved over vast zones, and in the process, some clans were absorbed into one or more other groups. Therefore, until recent times, absorptions were a source of many interclan conflicts.

In 1967, the Nagaland Assembly proclaimed English as the official language of Nagaland and it is the medium for education in Nagaland. Other than English, Nagamese, a creole language form of the Assamese language, is a widely spoken language. Every community has its own mother tongue but communicates with other communities in either Nagamese or English. However, English is the predominant spoken and written language in Nagaland. Hindi is also taught along with English in most schools and most Nagas prefer to used Hindi to communicate with the migrant workers of the state, that primarily comes from Bihar, UP and Madhya Pradesh. Hindi in India has been made official until class 10

Gallery

See also 
Nagaland
History of the Nagas
List of Naga ethnic groups
List of Naga languages
List of Naga people

References

Further reading 
Drouyer, A. Isabel, Drouyer René, " THE NAGAS: MEMORIES OF HEADHUNTERS- Indo-Burmese Borderlands vol.1"; White Lotus, 2016, .
 Wettstein, Marion. 2014. Naga Textiles: Design, Technique, Meaning and Effect of a Local Craft Tradition in Northeast India. Arnoldsche, Stuttgart 2014, .
 von Stockhausen, Alban. 2014. Imag(in)ing the Nagas: The Pictorial Ethnography of Hans-Eberhard Kauffmann and Christoph von Fürer-Haimendorf. Arnoldsche, Stuttgart 2014, .
Shongzan, Mayaso, "A Portrait of the Tangkhul Nagas"; Exodus, 2013, .
Stirn, Aglaja & Peter van Ham. The Hidden world of the Naga: Living Traditions in Northeast India. London: Prestel.
Oppitz, Michael, Thomas Kaiser, Alban von Stockhausen & Marion Wettstein. 2008. Naga Identities: Changing Local Cultures in the Northeast of India. Gent: Snoeck Publishers.
Kunz, Richard & Vibha Joshi. 2008. Naga – A Forgotten Mountain Region Rediscovered. Basel: Merian.

 Shimray, Atai, A.S. - "Let freedom ring?: Story of Naga nationalism".

Novels 
 Ben Doherty, Nagaland, Wild Dingo Press, Melbourne, 2018, .

External links 

 Official site of Nagaland state government
 Photos of Nagas in Burma by Goto Osami
 Photos of Nagas by Pablo Bartholomew
 Article "Textile & Bead Art of Nagaland"
 National Geographic Why These Headhunters Converted to Christianity
 Naga National Council's Official site

 
Sino-Tibetan-speaking people
Ethnic groups in Northeast India
Ethnic groups in Manipur
Ethnic groups in Myanmar
Indigenous peoples of South Asia
Indigenous peoples of Southeast Asia
Social groups of Assam
Scheduled Tribes of Nagaland
Ethnic groups in South Asia
Ethnic groups in Southeast Asia
Ethnic groups divided by international borders